Maharajavu is a 1989 Indian Malayalam film, directed by P. Krishnaraj. The film stars Murali, Shari, Captain Raju and Anuradha in the lead roles. The film has musical score by Sharmaji.

Cast
Murali
Shari
Captain Raju
Anuradha
K. P. Ummer
Shanavas

References

External links
 

1989 films
1980s Malayalam-language films